The by-election held in Mid Ulster on 8 May 1956 was called because both candidates in the 1955 Mid Ulster by-election were disqualified. Tom Mitchell was disqualified from assuming office because he was a convicted felon. Charles Beattie was awarded the seat but he was also disqualified because he held an office of profit under the Crown.

External links 
A Vision of Britain Through Time (Constituency elector numbers)

References 

Mid Ulster by-election
By-elections to the Parliament of the United Kingdom in County Londonderry constituencies
By-elections to the Parliament of the United Kingdom in County Tyrone constituencies
20th century in County Londonderry
20th century in County Tyrone
Mid Ulster by-election
Mid Ulster by-election